A pointe shoe, also called a ballet shoe, is a type of shoe worn by ballet dancers when performing pointe work. Pointe shoes were conceived in response to the desire for dancers to appear weightless and sylph-like and have evolved to enable dancers to dance en pointe (on the tips of their toes) for extended periods of time. They are manufactured in a variety of colors, most commonly in shades of light pink.

History

Women began to dance ballet in 1681, twenty years after King Louis XIV of France ordered the founding of the Académie Royale de Danse. At that time, the standard women's ballet shoe had heels. Mid-18th century dancer Marie Camargo of the Paris Opéra Ballet was the first to wear a non-heeled shoe, enabling her to perform leaps that would have been difficult, if not impossible, in the more conventional shoes of the age. After the French Revolution, heels were completely eliminated from standard ballet shoes. These flat-bottomed predecessors of the modern pointe shoe were secured to the feet by ribbons and incorporated pleats under the toes to enable dancers to leap, execute turns, and fully extend their feet.

The first dancers to rise up on their toes did so with the help of an invention by Charles Didelot in 1796. His "flying machine" lifted dancers upward, allowing them to stand on their toes before leaving the ground. This lightness and ethereal quality was well received by audiences and, as a result, choreographers began to look for ways to incorporate more pointe work into their pieces.

As dance progressed into the 19th century, the emphasis on technical skill increased, as did the desire to dance en pointe without the aid of wires. When Marie Taglioni first danced La Sylphide en pointe, her shoes were nothing more than modified satin slippers; the soles were made of leather and the sides and toes were darned to help the shoes hold their shapes. Because the shoes of this period offered no support, dancers would pad their toes for comfort and rely on the strength of their feet and ankles for support.

The next substantially different form of pointe shoe appeared in Italy in the late 19th century. Dancers like Pierina Legnani wore shoes with a sturdy, flat platform at the front end of the shoe, rather than the more sharply pointed toe of earlier models. These shoes also included a box—made of layers of fabric—for containing the toes, and a stiffer, stronger sole. They were constructed without nails and the soles were only stiffened at the toes, making them nearly silent. By 1880s, shoemaker Salvatore Capezio also improved the construction of pointe shoes after a series of work for repairing pointe shoes.

The birth of the modern pointe shoe is often attributed to the early 20th-century Russian ballerina Anna Pavlova, who was one of the most famous and influential dancers of her time. Pavlova had particularly high, arched insteps, which left her vulnerable to injury when dancing en pointe. She also had slender, tapered feet, which resulted in excessive pressure on her big toes. To compensate for this, she inserted toughened leather soles into her shoes for extra support and flattened and hardened the toe area to form a box.

Men have not historically performed in pointe shoes except for comedic effect. Examples of this include Les Ballets Trockadero de Monte Carlo, and characters such as Bottom in A Midsummer Night's Dream and the evil stepsisters in Cinderella.

Controversy
Pointe shoes employ structural reinforcements in both shank and toe box in an attempt to distribute the dancer's weight load throughout the feet, thus reducing the load on the toes enough to enable the dancer to support all their body weight on fully vertical feet.

But this belief is disputed. Nothing in pointe shoe design prevents a foot’s “slippage,” in which, when en pointe, the dancer’s weight forces their foot down into the shoe until their big toe meets the end of the toe box. Measurements have shown that most of the dancer's weight en pointe is borne by the big toe(s) regardless of the length of the second toe. Hence, such reinforcements cannot and do not distribute the weight load throughout the foot as claimed.

Construction

Every dancer has unique feet, with variations that include toe length and shape, arch flexibility, and mechanical strength. Consequently, most pointe shoe manufacturers produce more than one model of shoe, with each model offering a different fit, as well as custom fitted shoes. Regardless of the manufacturer or model, however, all pointe shoes share two important structural features that enable dancers to dance on the tips of their toes:

 A box within the front end of the shoe that encases and supports the dancer's toes.
 A shank, which is a piece of rigid material that serves to stiffen the sole so as to provide support for the arch of the en pointe foot.

The exterior of a pointe shoe is covered with fabric, thus concealing the box and other internal structural elements and lending an aesthetically pleasing look to the shoe. Most pointe shoes are covered with satin, but some are available with canvas exteriors. Pointe shoes are most often available in light pink colors and less commonly in black and white. In recent years, pointe shoes have also become more diverse in color. For example, many pointe shoe makers, like Bloch, offer pointe shoes in various skin tones ranging from light pink to deeper browns to suit darker complexions. When other colors are desired (e.g., to match a costume), pointe shoes may be dyed or, if available, ordered in custom colors.

The vamp refers to the shoe's upper piece, measured from the platform to the drawstring; normally, longer toes call for a longer vamp. The throat is the edge of the vamp above the arch of the foot; it is usually either v-shaped or round, which tend to suit feet with higher or lower arches, respectively. The drawstring is located within the binding on the throat; this may be made from either elastic or lace.

Box

The box is a rigid enclosure within the front end of the shoe that encases and supports the dancer's toes. The front end of the box is flattened so as to form a platform upon which the dancer can balance, and fabric covers the exterior of the box for aesthetics.

In conventional pointe shoes, the box is typically made from tightly packed layers of paper, paste and fabric that have been glued together and then shaped into an enclosure. When the glue dries, it becomes hard and provides the required stiffness. In some newer pointe shoes, the box may be made from plastic and rubber, with rigidity provided by the plastic.

Box shapes vary widely among shoe models and manufacturers. A number of shape attributes, including box length, height, taper angle and platform area, determine the suitability of a shoe for any particular foot.

Sole

For most pointe shoes, the sole is constructed from a piece of leather that is attached to the shoe with adhesive and reinforced by stitching along its edges. The sole overlaps and secures the unfinished edges of the shoe's exterior fabric. Pointe shoes may be manufactured with either scraped soles, which provide superior traction, or buffed soles, which have a smoother surface for reduced traction.

Aesthetic appearance is of paramount importance for modern pointe shoes. To achieve an elegant appearance, the shoe's more decorative outer fabric is prominently featured, covering the maximum possible area of the shoe's visible surfaces. To this end, the sole is made of thin material to give it a minimal profile, and a margin of satin is artfully pleated around it so that the sole covers only part of the bottom of the shoe.

Shank

Shanks are typically made from leather, plastic, cardstock, or layers of glue-hardened burlap. The flexibility of a shank is determined by its thickness and the type of material used. A shank's thickness may be consistent throughout or it may vary along its length to produce different strengths at select points. For example, slits may be cut across a shank at demi-pointe to enhance roll through. Also, a shank's thickness may transition at some point along its length in order to implement differing strengths above and below the transition. Standard pointe shoes typically have a full shank, in which the shank runs the full length of the sole, or fractional (e.g., half or three-quarter) length shanks. Many pointe shoe manufacturers offer a choice of shank materials, and some will build shoes with customized shanks of varying stiffness and length.

Different pointe shoe makers offer different strengths of shank. For example, Grishko, a Russian pointe shoe company, offers various shank strengths such as super soft, soft, medium, hard, and super hard. The strength of the shank mostly depends on the arch and strength of the dancer’s foot. If the dancer has a strong and flexible arch, they would need a hard or super hard shank to support the foot while en pointe properly. If the dancer is starting pointe and has weaker feet, a super soft or soft shank would be more suitable, allowing the dancer to pointe their foot more easily. Additionally, dancers will sometimes wear different pointe shoe models for different performance pieces. In such cases, the choreography can dictate the type of shank required; a lyrical style may call for a softer shoe, while an aggressive style with many turns is more easily performed in a hard, stiff shoe.

Ribbons and elastic band

A pointe shoe employs two fabric ribbons and an elastic band to secure it to the foot. Most of the work of securing shoes to feet is done by the ribbons. The two ribbons wrap around the dancer's ankle in opposite directions, overlapping one another so as to form a cross at the front. The ends are then tied together in a knot, which is then tucked under the ribbon on the inside of the ankle to hide it from view.

The elastic band—which traverses the front of the ankle below the ribbons—keeps the heel of the shoe in place against the foot when the dancer is en pointe. Optionally, two overlapped elastic bands may be used on each shoe to increase tension and holding power.

The locations where the band and ribbons attach to a shoe is critical, as incorrect placement can result in a poorly fitting shoe. Some dancers choose to sew the ribbons and elastics onto the inside of the shoe, whereas others sew them outside onto the silk exterior. Typically, the loose ends of newly sewn ribbons are briefly exposed to open flames to melt them and thus prevent fraying.

Pré-pointe shoe

A pré-pointe shoe, which is also variously called a break-down, "demi-pointe" or a soft-block shoe, shares many characteristics with pointe shoes. For example, its outer appearance resembles that of a pointe shoe and it has a toe box, although the box is softer and the wings (sides of the toe box) are typically not as deep as those found on pointe shoes. Pré-pointe shoes are secured to the feet with ribbons and elastic band in identical fashion to pointe shoes. Unlike pointe shoes, however, demi-pointe shoes have no shank and, as a result, they do not provide the support necessary for proper pointe work.

Pré-pointe shoes are most often used to train dancers who are new to pointe technique. They serve to acclimate dancers to the feel of wearing pointe shoes and to strengthen the ankles and feet in preparation for dancing en pointe in pointe shoes. The toe box allows the dancer to experience the feel of a pointe shoe, while the insole and outsole work together to provide the resistance needed for developing foot and ankle strength.

Manufacturing process

Traditional pointe shoes are usually manufactured using a method known as turnshoe, in which each shoe is initially assembled inside-out on a last and then turned right-side-out before finishing. When manufacturing standard pointe shoes, a standardized, common last is used for both left and right shoes, resulting in identical left and right shoes in a pair. Some ballerinas have custom-made lasts that replicate the shapes of their own feet; these may be supplied to a pointe shoe manufacturer for the purpose of manufacturing custom shoes.

Breaking in

Dancers typically "break in" new pointe shoes to reduce or eliminate the discomfort they commonly cause. Typically this is done by performing relevés that flex the box and shank in a natural manner, thus causing the box shape and shank flex points to adapt to the dancer's feet. Various other methods have been employed for breaking in pointe shoes, including deforming them with hands or against hard surfaces, striking them on hard surfaces, and moistening or heating the boxes to soften the glues, but these methods typically are ineffective as they do not cause the shoes to conform to the feet and also may damage the shoes or shorten their usable lifetimes. Pointe shoes usually are only broken in by professional dancers who use pointe shoes for multiple hours every day. Non-professional dancers and dancers beginning to learn pointe typically do not break in their pointe shoes by hand so that they last longer.

Accessories

A dancer may experience discomfort while wearing a pointe shoe even after the shoe has been broken in. Several devices are commonly used to mitigate the discomfort:

 Toe pads are pouches that encapsulate and cushion the toes from the unyielding box and prevent friction that can cause blistering. These are typically made from thin, fabric-covered gel sheets.
 Gel toe spacers of various shapes and sizes are inserted between toes; these serve to adjust toe spacing and alignment so as to alleviate pain at the bunion joint between the big toe and first toe.
 Lambswool is stretched and wrapped around toes to reduce chafing and the likelihood of blisters. After several uses, the lambswool becomes densely packed and custom fitted to the dancer's foot.
 Tape is wrapped around toes to reduce chafing and blisters.
 Blister pads are small gel squares that prevent damage from rubbing and friction.

Lifetime

In the course of normal use, there are three predominant types of wear on a pointe shoe that will determine its useful lifetime. The most important of these is shank wear. As the body of the shoe is repetitively flexed, the shank gradually weakens and loses its ability to provide support. A pointe shoe is no longer serviceable when the shank breaks or becomes too soft to provide support. The second is the softening of the box and especially the platform on which the dancer balances. When a pointe shoe has been worn to the point where it is no longer safe to wear, the shoe is typically referred to as “dead.”

The other primary type of wear involves the exterior fabric. In pointe work the front face and bottom edge of the toe box are subjected to friction against the performance surface. This friction will eventually wear through the shoe's outer fabric covering, thereby exposing the toe box and creating loose, frayed fabric edges. Unlike a weakened shank, damaged outer fabric does not affect the performance of a shoe. Due to its unprofessional appearance, however, damaged fabric may render the shoe unfit to wear in situations other than informal practice or rehearsal. 

Under moderate usage, a pair of pointe shoes will typically last through ten to twenty hours of wear. For dance students, this often translates into weeks or months of serviceable use from a pair of pointe shoes. Professional dancers typically wear out pointe shoes much more quickly; a new pair may wear out in a single performance. For example, in 2013 New York City Ballet ordered 8,500 pairs (for 180 dancers) and the Royal Ballet used approximately 12,000 pairs of pointe shoes.

The lifetime of a pointe shoe depends on many factors, including:

 Usage: More aggressive dance styles and more frequent, longer durations of use will hasten wear.
 Dance technique: Improper technique subjects shoes to unusual stresses that may lead to premature failure.
 Fit: Well fitting pointe shoes encourage proper technique, which in turn leads to longer shoe life.
 Weight: Greater dancer weight exerts proportionally greater stresses to the shoes, leading to faster wear.
 Construction: Varying qualities and types of construction will yield different life expectancies.
 Shank material: The stiffness and integrity of various shank materials will degrade at varying rates.
 Breaking-in: The breaking-in process simulates accelerated wear, and thus may shorten the life of a shoe.
 Performance surface: Rough surfaces cause rapid wear of the exterior fabric, in contrast to smooth surfaces such as Marley floors, which minimize the rate of fabric wear.
 Foot Strength: Stronger arch muscles exert greater force on the shank, causing it to bend more and thus accelerating its wear.

See also
Ballet shoe
Pointe technique
Category:Pointe shoe manufacturers

References

Dance shoes
Ballet terminology